The New Pole for Italy (NPI), better known as the Third Pole and less frequently as Pole of the Nation, was a centrist coalition of parties in Italy active from late 2010 to sometime in 2012.

The NPI was founded on 15 December 2010 both as an alternative to the centre-right coalition between The People of Freedom and Lega Nord led by Silvio Berlusconi, and to the centre-left coalition between the Democratic Party and Italy of Values, led by Pier Luigi Bersani. Most NPI members were former supporters of Berlusconi, but there is also a relevant group of disillusioned Democrats. The constituent members of the coalition were the Union of the Centre (leader: Pier Ferdinando Casini), Future and Freedom (Gianfranco Fini), Alliance for Italy (Francesco Rutelli) and the Movement for the Autonomies (Raffaele Lombardo).

The NPI, which was never an electoral coalition, was disbanded sometime in 2012, after Casini announced that he was no longer interested in the project. Rutelli's ApI even returned to the centre-left and one of its members, Bruno Tabacci, decided to run in the 2012 Italian centre-left primary election.

In September 2012 Luca Cordero di Montezemolo announced that he would take part through his Future Italy association to the formation o a new "popular, reform and authentically liberal force" which would hegemonize the political centre of Italian politics, in dialogue with "responsible people" of the established parties. Casini and Fini responded by proposing a joint "List for Italy" without party symbols. In January 2013, after Mario Monti had announced his intention to step in into politics, Future Italy and other groups formed Civic Choice with direct support from Monti. Subsequently, Civic Choice, UdC and FLI joined forces in the With Monti for Italy coalition.

Composition

Further reading

References

Defunct political party alliances in Italy
2010 establishments in Italy
2012 disestablishments in Italy
Political parties established in 2010
Political parties disestablished in 2012